Epidermodysplasia verruciformis (EV), also known as treeman syndrome, is an extremely rare inherited skin condition. It is chiefly an autosomal recessive hereditary skin disorder associated with a high risk of skin cancer. It is characterized by abnormal susceptibility to human papillomaviruses (HPVs) of the skin. The resulting uncontrolled HPV infections result in the growth of scaly macules and papules resembling tree bark, particularly on the hands and feet. It is typically associated with HPV types 5 and 8, which are found in about 80% of the normal population as asymptomatic infections, although other types contribute less frequently, among them types 12, 14, 15 and 17 (which are occasionally referred to as the beta papillomaviruses).

The condition usually has an onset of between the ages of one and 20 but it can occasionally be present in middle age. The condition is also known as Lewandowsky–Lutz dysplasia, named after the physicians who first documented it, Felix Lewandowsky and Wilhelm Lutz.

Signs and symptoms 
Clinical diagnostic features are lifelong eruptions of pityriasis versicolor-like macules, flat wart-like papules, one to many cutaneous horn-like lesions, and development of cutaneous carcinomas.

Patients present with flat, slightly scaly, red-brown macules on the face, neck, and body, recurring especially around the penial area, or verruca-like papillomatous lesions, seborrheic keratosis-like lesions, and pinkish-red plane papules on the hands, upper and lower extremities, and face. The initial form of EV presents with only flat, wart-like lesions over the body, whereas the malignant form shows a higher rate of polymorphic skin lesions and development of multiple cutaneous tumors.

Generally, cutaneous lesions are spread over the body, but some cases have only a few lesions which are limited to one extremity.

Genetics 
Most patients with classic EV carry bialletic loss-of-function mutations of transmembrane channel-like protein 6 (TMC6; also called EV protein 1, EVER1), TMC8 (also called EVER2), or calcium- and integrin-binding protein 1 (CIB1).  The EVER1 or EVER2 genes are located adjacent to one another on chromosome 17. These genes play a role in regulating the distribution of zinc in the cell nuclei. Zinc is a necessary cofactor for many viral proteins, and the activity of EVER1/EVER2 complex appears to restrict the access of viral proteins to cellular zinc stores, limiting their growth.

Other genes have also rarely been associated with this condition. These include the ras homolog gene family member H.

Treatment 
No curative treatment against EV has been found yet. Several treatments have been suggested, and acitretin 0.5–1 mg/day for 6 months' duration is the most effective treatment owing to antiproliferative and differentiation-inducing effects. Interferons can also be used effectively together with retinoids.

Cimetidine was reported to be effective because of its depressing mitogen-induced lymphocyte proliferation and regulatory T cell activity features. A report by Oliveira et al. showed that cimetidine was ineffective. Hayashi et al. applied topical calcipotriol to a patient with a successful result.

As mentioned, various treatment methods are offered against EV; however, most importantly, education of the patient, early diagnosis, and excision of the tumoral lesions take preference to prevent the development of cutaneous tumors.

Notable cases

Ion Toader
In March 2007, a Romanian man named Ion Toader was diagnosed with this condition. A patient of dermatologist Carmen Madeleine Curea, his pictures appeared on numerous blogs and Romanian press sources. Curea works with Spitalul Clinic Colentina in Bucharest, Romania. Stephen Stone, past president of the American Academy of Dermatology, confirmed that this was Lewandowsky–Lutz. Toader underwent surgery in late 2013, and since then has been mostly symptom-free, with only small reappearances.

Dede Koswara
In November 2007, a video of a 35-year-old Indonesian man named Dede Koswara with a similar disease appeared on the Internet. His story appeared on the U.S. Discovery Channel and TLC series My Shocking Story (Extraordinary People on UK's Five) in the episode "Half Man Half Tree". On August 12, 2008, Koswara's story was the subject of an ABC's Medical Mystery episode entitled "Tree Man".

On 26 August 2008, Koswara returned home following surgery to remove  of warts from his body. The surgery consisted of three steps:
 Removal of the thick carpet of warts and massive horns on his hands
 Removal of the smaller warts on his head, torso, and feet
 Covering of the hands with grafted skin

In all, 96% of the warts were removed. The surgery was documented by the Discovery Channel and TLC in the episode "Treeman: Search for the Cure". However, his warts returned and he was thought to require two surgeries per year for the rest of his life in order to manage the warts. The Discovery Channel funded a blood analysis and found he lacked an immune system antigen to fight yeast infection. He was offered to have more tests run to determine whether it is treatable, and the doctor was fairly optimistic, but he refused the treatment.

According to The Jakarta Post, Koswara underwent the first of a series of new surgical procedures to remove the regrown warts in the spring of 2011. Surgery had, however, proven to be a temporary solution for Koswara, as the warts continued to re-emerge. He had thus undergone three surgical operations since his major surgery in 2008. At the end of December 2010, two doctors from the Japanese Society for Complementary and Alternative Medicine brought him a drug made from Job's tears. The medicine was still undergoing lab tests as of 2016.

Koswara died on 30 January 2016 at Hasan Sadikin Hospital, Bandung, from the complications related to his condition.

In 2009, the Discovery Channel episode "Treeman Meets Treeman" reported on another Indonesian man, from the same region as Koswara, who also has the disease and was given a similar treatment for it. His treatment seemed to have worked better.

Omar Tamim
In 2013, one case of epidermodysplasia verruciformis was reported in Iraq. No treatment was given since the condition was initially misdiagnosed.

Abul Bajandar
In January 2016, a 25-year-old patient named Abul Bajandar from Khulna, Bangladesh was admitted in Dhaka Medical College and Hospital and was diagnosed with this condition. Doctors at the hospital decided to form a medical board for the treatment of the patient. Over the following year, Bajandar underwent at least 25 surgeries for the removal of the warts—weighing in excess of —from his hands, feet, and legs. Bajandar’s condition returned after he interrupted treatments in May 2018. His doctors requested that he return for treatment many times. He finally returned for treatment in late 2018, but his condition had significantly worsened and spread to his feet. He will reportedly need five to six operations to get the condition back under control. In June 2019 he requested to get his hands amputated as the pain is unbearable.

Sahana Khatun
In January 2017 it was reported that a 10-year-old girl in Bangladesh, Sahana Khatun, was diagnosed after developing lesions four months earlier. BBC News said that the case may have been the first diagnosis in a female.

Mohammed Taluli
In August 2017 it was reported that a 42-year-old man from Gaza, Mohammed Taluli, had been successfully operated on at the Hadassah Medical Centre in Jerusalem.

Cristhél Suyapa Martínez
In October 2018, a five-year-old girl in Honduras, Cristhél Suyapa Martínez, was diagnosed with the condition.

Sebastian Quinn 
Sebastian Quinn is a Pittsburgh man with the condition who featured as a patient on an episode of TLC's My Feet Are Killing Me in January 2021. His overseeing specialist Ebonie Vincent operated on him to manage the growths on his feet.

References

Further reading

External links 

Virus-related cutaneous conditions
Rare diseases
Papillomavirus-associated diseases
Epidermal nevi, neoplasms, and cysts
Defects in innate immunity